Długosz is a Polish surname. Notable people with the surname include:
 Jan Długosz (1415–1480), Polish bishop and chronicler
 Jan Długosz (1929–1962), Polish mountaineer
 Leszek Długosz (born 1941), Polish actor
 Louis F. Dlugosz (1915–2002), American sculptor
 Ryszard Długosz (born 1941), Polish wrestler
 Wiktor Długosz, Polish footballer

See also
 
 Długosz, Masovian Voivodeship, village in Poland

Polish-language surnames